The In a World Like This Tour (also known as the 20th Anniversary Tour) was the ninth concert tour by American boy band, the Backstreet Boys. Supporting their eighth studio album, In a World Like This (2013), the tour consisted of over 150 shows in Asia, North America and Europe. It is the band's first tour featuring all five original members as a quintet in seven years, as band member Kevin Richardson left the band in June 2006, and rejoined in 2012. It has become one of the biggest tours in the group's tenure.

The tour was the 44th highest grossing worldwide tour in 2014 with total gross of $32.8 million and ticket sales of 607,407. This does not include the tour's 2013 and 2015 dates. The tour also broke record in China, when over 1,000 tickets were sold within one minute in Guangzhou on June 8, 2013.

Background

News of the tour was first released in January 2013, with stops planned for China (known as the 20th Anniversary Tour). Since the initial announcement, the band received a star on the Hollywood Walk of Fame and released the trailer for their upcoming documentary. In May 2013, band member Nick Carter called in to On Air with Ryan Seacrest to state the band were planning a North American tour, alongside their album release. The band officially announced the tour on Good Morning America. According to band member A. J. McLean, the concerts will have a theatrical feel, performed as a mini-movie. They will perform their notable songs and tracks from their new album. Fatima Robinson and Rich+Tone will serve as choreographers.

On March 14, 2014, Backstreet Boys appeared via satellite on Good Morning America from Norway, to announce the second North American leg. Avril Lavigne was opening act for the US dates.

Chicago incident
The sold-out show at the FirstMerit Bank Pavilion was cut short due to the city's curfew. Towards the end of the show, with 5 songs left, the group's microphones were turned off and lights were cut. According to a statement by Live Nation, the concert started late and they hoped to finish by the curfew. However, the show was cut off at 10:55pm, five minutes short of the curfew. The group promised they would return to Chicago to give their fans a full show, and they announced in 2014 that another show will be held at the same venue on June 11, 2014.

Israel cancellation
In May 2014, the group announced three concert dates in Israel for July 2014. All three were sold out in an hour and a half.
However, in July 2014, they were forced to postpone all three shows for safety reasons due to the 2014 Israel–Gaza conflict. Shortly afterwards, a photo depicting an Israeli mortar shells with the words "That's for cancelling the Backstreet Boys, you scum!" inscribed on its shaft in Hebrew went viral. A few days later another photo went viral, this time depicting four IDF soldiers holding signs in Hebrew which translate to "The reservists" "demand" "the Backstreet Boys" "In Israel!". As of November 2014 the group has not commented on either photo, but they have rescheduled the shows for May 2015 at the same venue.

Broadcasts and recordings
The show on October 11, 2013 in Saitama, Japan was filmed and released on DVD and Blu-ray in Japan on March 28, 2014. There are also special editions including behind-the-scene footage.

Opening acts
Jesse McCartney (North America—Leg 2, select dates)
DJ Pauly D (North America—Leg 2, select dates)
The Exchange  (Europe—Leg 5, select dates)
All Saints (United Kingdom & Ireland)
Victoria Duffield (North America—Leg 6, select dates)
Avril Lavigne (North America—Leg 6, select dates)
Baylee Littrell (Montreal)
B5 (Grand Prairie, The Woodlands, Cedar Park)
Redrama (Helsinki)
 Tippy Dos Santos (Pasay)
 All Our Exes Live in Texas (Australia)

Setlist
Typically a show of this tour consists of 22–23 songs, including an acoustic set of 4–5 songs during which the group members play instruments. Kevin Richardson plays keyboard, Brian Littrell and Nick Carter play acoustic guitar, Howie Dorough plays bass guitar, and AJ McLean plays percussion and Cajón. The acoustic set starts with an a cappella rendition of "Safest Place to Hide" (replaced with "Drowning" since May 2014), and includes one wild card song that vary between shows, such as "Back to Your Heart" in Tuscaloosa, "Just Want You to Know" in Amsterdam, "Trust Me" in London, "Siberia" in Manchester, and "Just To Be Close To You" in Kuala Lumpur.

The following setlist is obtained from the concert held at the Molson Canadian Amphitheatre on August 7, 2013. It is not a representation of all shows on the tour.
"The Call"
"Don't Want You Back"
"Incomplete"
"Permanent Stain"
"All I Have to Give"
"As Long as You Love Me"
"Show 'Em (What You're Made Of)"
"Show Me the Meaning of Being Lonely"
"Breathe"
"I'll Never Break Your Heart"
"We've Got it Goin' On"
"Safest Place to Hide" (a cappella)
"10,000 Promises" (acoustic)
"Madeleine" (acoustic)
"Quit Playing Games (with My Heart)" (acoustic)
"The One"
"Love Somebody"
"More than That"
"In a World like This"
"I Want It That Way"
Encore

Beginning from the second Asian leg in October 2013, "More Than That" was replaced with "Shape of My Heart". "Safest Place to Hide" was replaced with "Drowning" starting from the San Diego show in May 2014.

Tour dates

Festivals and other miscellaneous performances

This concert was a part of "Mixfest"
This concert was a part of the "Santa Slam"
This concert was a part of the "Miracle on State Street"
This concert was a part of the "Mistletoe Show"
This concert was a part of the "Holiday Ho Show"
This concert was a part of "O Starry Night"
This concert was a part of the "Mistletoe Meltdown"
This concert was a part of the "All Star Christmas"
This concert was a part of "Jingle Jam"
This concert was a part of "All I Want for Christmas"
This concert was a part of "T'was the Week before Christmas"
This concert was a part of the "East Coast Live"
This concert was a part of the "Barclaycard British Summer Time Festival"
This concert was a part of the "Skovrock"
This concert was a part of the "Odderøya Live"
This concert was a part of the "Tall Ships' Races"
This concert was a part of the "Live at Sunset"
This concert was a part of the "Moon and Stars"
This concert was a part of the "Lucca Summer Festival"

Cancellations and rescheduled shows

Box office score data

External links
Backstreet Boys Official Website

References

Backstreet Boys concert tours
2013 concert tours
2014 concert tours
2015 concert tours